Ankhesenamun ("Her Life Is of Amun"; c. 1348 or c. 1342 – after 1322 BC) was a queen who lived during the 18th Dynasty of Egypt as the pharaoh Akhenaten's daughter and subsequently became the Great Royal Wife of pharaoh Tutankhamun. Born Ankhesenpaaten ("she lives for the Aten"), she was the third of six known daughters of the Egyptian Pharaoh Akhenaten and his Great Royal Wife Nefertiti. She became the Great Royal Wife of Tutankhamun. The change in her name reflects the changes in ancient Egyptian religion during her lifetime after her father's death. Her youth is well documented in the ancient reliefs and paintings of the reign of her parents. The mummy of Tutankhamun's mother has been identified through DNA analysis as a full sister to his father, the unidentified mummy found in tomb KV55, and as a daughter of his grandfather, Amenhotep III. So far his mother's name is uncertain, but her mummy is known informally to scientists as the Younger Lady.

Ankhesenamun was well documented as being the Great Royal Wife of Pharaoh Tutankhamun. Initially, she may have been married to her father and it is possible that, upon the death of Tutankhamun, she was married briefly to Tutankhamun's successor, Ay, who is believed by some to be her maternal grandfather.

DNA test results on mummies discovered in KV21 were released in February 2010, which has given rise to speculation that one of two late 18th Dynasty queens buried in that tomb could be Ankhesenamun. Because of their DNA, both mummies are thought to be members of that ruling house.

Early life

Ankhesenpaaten was born in a time when Egypt was in the midst of an unprecedented religious revolution (c. 1348 BC). Her father had abandoned the principal worship of old deities of Egypt in favor of the Aten, hitherto a minor aspect of the sun-god, characterised as the sun's disc.

She is believed to have been born in Thebes, around year 4 of her father's reign, but probably grew up in the city of Akhetaten (present-day Amarna), established as the new capital of the kingdom by her father. The three eldest daughters – Meritaten, Meketaten, and Ankhesenpaaten – became the "senior princesses" and participated in many functions of the government and religion alongside their parents.

Later life

She is believed to have been married first to her own father, which was not unusual for Egyptian royal families. She is thought to have been the mother of the princess Ankhesenpaaten Tasherit (possibly by her father or by Smenkhkare), although the parentage is unclear.

After her father's death and the short reigns of Smenkhkare and Neferneferuaten, she became the wife of Tutankhamun. Following their marriage, the couple honored the deities of the restored religion by changing their names to Tutankhamun and Ankhesenamun. The couple appear to have had two stillborn daughters. As Tutankhamun's only known wife was Ankhesenamun, it is highly likely the fetuses found in his tomb are her daughters. Some time in the 9th year of his reign, about the age of 18, Tutankhamun died suddenly, leaving Ankhesenamun alone and without an heir about the age 21.

A blue glass ring of unknown provenance obtained in 1931 depicts the prenomen of Ay and the name of Ankhesenamun enclosed in cartouches. This indicates that Ankhesenamun married Ay shortly before she disappeared from history, although no monuments show her as great royal wife to him. On the walls of Ay's tomb it is Tey (Ay's senior wife), not Ankhesenamun, who appears as his great royal wife. She probably died during or shortly after his reign and no burial has been found for her yet.

Hittite letters
A document was found in the ancient Hittite capital of Hattusa that dates to the Amarna period: the so-called "Deeds" of Suppiluliuma I. The document relates that Hittite ruler, Suppiluliuma I, while being in siege on Karkemish, received a letter from the Egyptian queen. The letter reads:
	
My husband has died and I have no son. They say about you that you have many sons. You might give me one of your sons to become my husband. I would not wish to take one of my subjects as a husband... I am afraid.

This document is considered extraordinary, as Egyptians traditionally considered foreigners to be inferior. Suppiluliuma I was amazed and exclaimed to his courtiers:

Nothing like this has happened to me in my entire life!

Understandably, he was wary and had an envoy investigate, but by delaying, he missed his apparent opportunity to bring Egypt into his empire. He eventually did send one of his sons, Zannanza, but the prince died en route, perhaps being murdered.

The identity of the queen who wrote the letter is uncertain. In the Hittite annals, she is called Dakhamunzu, a transliteration of the Egyptian title, Tahemetnesu (The King's Wife). Possible candidates for the author of the letter are Nefertiti, Meritaten, and Ankhesenamun. Ankhesenamun once seemed likely since there were no royal candidates for the throne on the death of her husband, Tutankhamun, whereas Akhenaten had at least two legitimate successors. But this was based on a 27-year reign for the last 18th dynasty, pharaoh Horemheb, who is now accepted to have had a shorter reign of only 14 years. Since Nefertiti was depicted as powerful as her husband in official monuments smiting Egypt's enemies, researcher Nicholas Reeves believes she might be the Dakhamunzu in the Amarna correspondence. That would make the subject deceased Egyptian king appear to be Akhenaten rather than Tutankhamun. As noted, Akhenaten had potential heirs, including Tutankhamun, to whom Nefertiti could be married. Other researchers focus upon the phrase regarding marriage to 'one of my subjects' (translated by some as 'servants') as possibly a reference to the Grand Vizier Ay or a secondary member of the Egyptian royal family line, however, and that Ankhesenamun may have been being pressured by Ay to marry him and legitimize his claim to the throne of Egypt (which she eventually did).

Mummy KV21A

DNA testing announced in February 2010 has generated speculation that Ankhesenamun is one of two 18th Dynasty queens recovered from KV21 in the Valley of the Kings.

The two fetuses found buried with Tutankhamun have been proven to be his children, and the current theory is that Ankhesenamun, his only known wife, is their mother. However, not enough data was obtained to make more than a tentative identification. Nevertheless, the KV21a mummy has DNA consistent with the 18th Dynasty royal line.

KV63
After excavating the tomb KV63, it is speculated that it was designed for Ankhesenamun due to its proximity to the tomb of Tutankhamun, KV62. Also found in the tomb were coffins (one with an imprint of a woman on it), women's clothing, jewelry, and natron. Fragments of pottery bearing the partial name Paaten were also in the tomb. The only royal person known to bear this name was Ankhesenamun, whose name was originally Ankhesenpaaten. However, no mummies were found in KV63.

Popular culture

Ankhesenamun's name has entered popular culture as the secret love of the priest Imhotep in the 1932 film The Mummy. The 1999 remake, its sequel and its spin-off television series used the name Anck-su-namun, while other movies like The Mummy's Hand (1940)  and the 1959 remake named the character Ananka.

Ancestry and family

References

Further reading 
Akhenaten, King of Egypt by Cyril Aldred (1988), Thames & Hudson

External links
 

14th-century BC Egyptian women
Queens consort of the Eighteenth Dynasty of Egypt
Princesses of the Eighteenth Dynasty of Egypt
1340s BC births
1320s BC deaths
Tutankhamun
Children of Akhenaten
Nefertiti
Ay
People from Thebes, Egypt
Remarried royal consorts